"Fooled Again" is a song by Australian pop group Pseudo Echo. It was released in November 1988 as the lead single from the band's third studio album, Race.  The song peaked at number 33 on the ARIA Charts.

Track listing 
7" (EMI 2121)
Side A "Fooled Again" – 3:58
Side B "Take On the World" – 3:46

CD single (CDED 385)
 "Fooled Again"
 "Take On The World"
 "Runaways"

Charts

References 

1988 songs
RCA Records singles
1988 singles
Pseudo Echo songs